German submarine U-679 was a Type VIIC U-boat built for Nazi Germany's Kriegsmarine for service during World War II.
She was laid down on 3 September 1942 by Howaldtswerke-Deutsche Werft, Hamburg as yard number 828, launched on 18 September 1943 and commissioned on 29 November 1943 under Leutnant zur See Friedrich Breckwoldt.

Design
German Type VIIC submarines were preceded by the shorter Type VIIB submarines. U-679 had a displacement of  when at the surface and  while submerged. She had two shafts and two  propellers.

U-679 was fitted with five  torpedo tubes (four fitted at the bow and one at the stern), fourteen torpedoes, one  SK C/35 naval gun, (220 rounds), one  Flak M42 and two twin  C/30 anti-aircraft guns. The boat had a complement of between forty-four and sixty.

Service history
The boat's career began with training at 31st Flotilla on 29 November 1943, followed by active service on 1 August 1944 as part of the 8th Flotilla. U-679 took part in no wolfpacks. However, the wreckage was located in August 2015 and initial reports suggest that actually U-679 had run into a mine and sank after that. Wreckage lies at depth of 90 metres at a location, which is somewhat different from the information given earlier.

Summary of raiding history

References

Notes

Citations

Bibliography

External links

German Type VIIC submarines
1943 ships
U-boats commissioned in 1943
U-boats sunk in 1945
World War II submarines of Germany
Ships built in Hamburg
U-boats sunk by Soviet warships
U-boats sunk by depth charges
Ships lost with all hands
World War II shipwrecks in the Baltic Sea
Maritime incidents in January 1945